Emilia Unda (January 29, 1879 – December 7, 1939) was Baltic German stage and film actress. She is best known for her role as the headmistress in the 1931 film Mädchen in Uniform.

Unda was married to German architect Hugo Häring in 1918. However, the couple later divorced.

Filmography

References

Bibliography
 Langford, Michelle. Directory of World Cinema: Germany. Intellect Books, 2012.

External links

1879 births
1939 deaths
German film actresses
German silent film actresses
20th-century German actresses
Baltic-German people
Actors from Riga
Emigrants from the Russian Empire to Germany